General Worsley may refer to:

Charles Worsley (1622–1656), English Army major general
Henry Worsley (East India Company officer) (1768–1841), British Army major general
Richard Worsley (1923–2013), British Army general